Madhavaram Mofussil Bus Terminus (MMBT) is a satellite bus termini of Chennai, India, located in the neighbourhood of Madhavaram, providing outstation/inter-state transport services. It will chiefly handle buses to Andhra Pradesh and Telangana, including cities such as Chittoor, Tirupati, Nellore, Vijayawada, Kurnool, Puttaparthi, Visakhapatnam, Bhadrachalam, and Hyderabad. As of 2018, the number of passengers travelling from Chennai to these two states daily average 12,500. The Tamil Nadu and Andhra governments operate about 315 services daily, which increases during weekends.

History
The terminus was built in 2018 at a cost of  950 million  by BNR Infrastructure Projects, Chennai. It was inaugurated on 10 October 2018 by the Tamil Nadu Chief Minister Edappadi K. Palaniswami. The MTC runs 77 trips every day.

The terminus
The level at grade can accommodate 42 buses and the upper level can accommodate 50 buses. There are nine slots meant for city buses. The parking space can hold 1,700 two-wheelers and 72 cars.

There are six staircases, three elevators, two ATM counters, two ticket counters, and an information office in the terminus. It additionally has provisions for eight shops, a restaurant, an infant-feeding room, a family waiting hall, crew rest room, health clinic, pharmacy and a dormitory.

The terminus is served by a 40,000-litre overhead tank, a 500,000-litre underground sump for water, and a 200,000-litre sewage treatment plant. The premises is lit by five high-mast lights.

The terminus constructed in the land which earlier is a part of Madhavaram Truck Terminal which is also owned by the CMDA.

See also
 Chennai Mofussil Bus Terminus
 Chennai Contract Carriage Bus Terminus
 Kilambakkam bus terminus
 Transport in Chennai

References

Bus stations in Chennai